Michael John Cosgrove (born February 17, 1951) is a former Major League Baseball pitcher with the Houston Astros from 1972 to 1976. Cosgrove was used primarily as a left-handed relief pitcher. His best seasons came in 1974 and 1975. In '74 he was 7–3 with a 3.50 ERA and 2 saves in 90 innings pitched. For '75 Cosgrove went 1–2 with a 3.03 ERA and recorded 5 saves in 71.1 innings pitched.

Baseball Draft
Cosgrove graduated high school in 1969 from Bourgade Catholic High School in Phoenix, Arizona and was the 16th round pick (374th overall) of the Cincinnati Reds of the 1969 June Baseball draft. He declined and went to  Phoenix College. He was then drafted in the January 1970 secondary Baseball draft in the 2nd round (38th overall) by the Houston Astros and assigned to play for the Cocoa Astros of the Florida State League.

External links
, or Retrosheet

1951 births
Living people
Baseball players from Phoenix, Arizona
Charleston Charlies players
Cocoa Astros players
Columbus Astros players
Houston Astros players
Iowa Oaks players
Major League Baseball pitchers
Oklahoma City 89ers players
Orlando Juice players
Phoenix Bears baseball players
Phoenix College alumni